The Badminton competition at the 2006 Central American and Caribbean Games was held in the Pavilion of Parque del Este in Santo Domingo, Dominican Republic as a sub-cities for Cartagena, Colombia. The tournament was scheduled to be held from 15–30 July 2006.

Medal summary

Men's events

Women's events

Mixed events

Medal table

Results

Men's singles

Women's singles

Men's doubles

Women's doubles

Mixed doubles

Participants

References

External links 
 

2006 Central American and Caribbean Games
Central American and Caribbean Games
2006
Central American and Caribbean Games
Sport in Santo Domingo